Paraburkholderia phytofirmans is a species of bacteria. They have been reported to colonize endophytic tissues of hybrid spruce (Picea glauca x engelmannii) and lodgepole pine with a strong potential to perform biological nitrogen fixation and plant growth promotion.

References 

phytofirmans
Bacteria described in 2005